Oak Hill High School is a high school located outside of Converse, Indiana.  The School was founded in 1959, combining nearby high schools Sweetser, Swayzee, and Converse.  There are three elementary school in the school district located in these towns now.  The junior high is connected to the high school.

Academics
Oak Hill has a strong foundation of academic excellence since the school was founded in 1959.  The High school scored a perfect 4.00 in the annual IDOE evaluation for the 2012 school year.

Athletics
The Golden Eagles compete in the Central Indiana Conference (CIC). They switched to the CIC in 2006 after formerly being in the Three Rivers Conference (TRC) and the Mid-Indiana Conference (MIC).  Oak Hill is known to have had a strong football tradition, winning the Class A state championship in 1982. More recently, Oak Hill has been known for the success of their girls' basketball program.  The girls' team was Class 2A state runner-up in the 2007–08 and 2008-09 seasons, as well as the 2016-2017 season. They then won a state championship in 2018-19. The Oak Hill boys' basketball program won a 2A state championship in the 2017-18 season. Oak Hill's boys' swimming and diving team set a school record for 100 consecutive dual meet wins in 2011. Girls' high jumper Janae Moffitt won the 2013 state championship with a jump of 5'10". Boys' diver Caden Lake won a state championship in diving in 2019.

Notable alumni
 Monte Towe - Former NBA player for the Denver Nuggets. 
 Keith O'Conner Murphy - Rockabilly Hall of Fame Singer-songwriter, Stacy and King Records (United States), Polydor Records (England)
 Laurell K. Hamilton (AKA Lori Klein) - New York Times best-selling author

See also
 List of high schools in Indiana

References

Public high schools in Indiana
Educational institutions established in 1959
Schools in Grant County, Indiana
1959 establishments in Indiana